Stanley James Spinks (16 October 1912 – 23 October 2003) was an Australian rules footballer who played for the Hawthorn Football Club in the Victorian Football League (VFL) during the 1930s. He played as both a centreman and wingman in his career.

Stan's father, Charles Spinks was a founder of the Hawthorn Football club in 1902.

Spinks finished second in the 1938 Brownlow Medal count, missing out by one vote to Dick Reynolds. He did, however, win that season's Hawthorn best and fairest, having won the award previously in 1932. In 1941 he quit the club after being dropped to the reserves side. He finished his playing career with Camberwell in the Victorian Football Association, but later returned to Hawthorn as coach of their thirds team in 1946. He also became an active committeeman (1947-1951-55) and he served as a club selector for more than a decade.

In 2007, Stan Spinks was inducted into the Hawthorn Hall of Fame.

Honours and achievements
Individual
 2× Hawthorn best and fairest: 1932, 1938
 Hawthorn Hall of Fame
 Hawthorn life member

References

External links

1912 births
2003 deaths
Australian rules footballers from Melbourne
Hawthorn Football Club players
Peter Crimmins Medal winners
Camberwell Football Club players
People from Hawthorn, Victoria